Yankasso is a village in the Safané Department of Mouhoun province of Burkina Faso. It was the site of a serious defeat of the French colonial forces in December 1915.

Location
As of the 1996 census, the population of Yankasso was 2,012.

Battle of 23 December 1915

In November 1915 there was a revolt in the Black Volta bend against the French.
The administrator Jules Brévié arrived at the end of the month to review the situation.
On 21 December 1915 a French column left Dédougou led by commandant Simonin.
Yankasso was then a large Marka village on the route leading south to Bouna.
Simonin suffered a serious check at Yankasso on 23 December.
Brévié was present at the battle.
The defeat was a political disaster for the colonial forces, since it showed they were not invincible.
Within a few days the revolt had spread to the whole of the Volta bend.
On 2 March 1916 the French returned and destroyed the village.
Most of Burkina Faso was at peace by the end of July 1916.

Notes

Sources

Mouhoun Province
Populated places in the Boucle du Mouhoun Region